The Krays may refer to:

Kray twins, 1950s-1960s British organised crime leaders
The Krays (film), directed by Peter Medak, about the Kray twins
The Krays (band), a streetpunk band from Brooklyn, New York